Left Unity may refer to:

Left Unity (UK), a UK political party founded in 2013
Left Unity (European Parliament), a grouping in the European Parliament which existed from 1989 to 1994
Workers' Party of Spain – Communist Unity, a tendency within the Spanish Socialist Workers' Party

See also
United front
Popular front